Douglas Todd Loewen (born September 16, 1966) is a Canadian politician and the Member of the Legislative Assembly of Alberta for Central Peace-Notley. Loewen was first elected in 2015 as a member of the Wildrose Party for the electoral district of Grande Prairie-Smoky. He was afterward elected in Central Peace-Notley as a member of the United Conservative Party and briefly sat as an independent until being welcomed back by premier Danielle Smith.

On June 1, 2022, Loewen registered his candidacy in the 2022 United Conservative Party leadership election, which was held on October 6, 2022. He finished fifth.

Early life
Todd Loewen moved to the Valleyview area at a young age, in 1967, with his parents and two brothers where he lived on a farm and homestead. In 1989, Loewen purchased his own farm and started a small business.

Political career
Todd Loewen first contested a seat in the Legislative Assembly of Alberta in the 2008 Alberta general election in the Grande Prairie-Smoky electoral district as a member of the Wildrose Alliance, finishing third with 13 per cent of the vote behind Progressive Conservative incumbent Mel Knight and Liberal John Croken. Loewen, following his defeat, served as the Northern Director for the Wildrose board for two years and as one of the three members of the board on the Wildrose leadership nominating committee in 2009.

Loewen again stood as the candidate for the renamed Wildrose Party in the 2012 Alberta general election in Grande-Prairie-Smoky finishing second with 41 per cent of the vote behind Progressive Conservative and former Reeve of County of Grande Prairie Everett McDonald who captured 46 per cent of the vote.

In the 2015 Alberta general election Loewen was elected to the Legislative Assembly of Alberta for Grande Prairie-Smoky capturing 33 per cent of the vote. Loewen defeated New Democrat candidate Todd Russell (31 per cent) and incumbent Everett McDonald. After the election, Loewen was appointed as the Official Opposition's critic for Environment and Parks, a position he retained when the Wildrose Party merged with the Progressive Conservative Association of Alberta in 2017 to form the United Conservative Party (UCP). During the 29th Legislature Loewen came under public scrutiny when he insinuated New Democrat Rod Loyola received illegal election contributions from South America.

Loewen was elected in the newly formed Central Peace-Notley electoral district in the 2019 Alberta general election capturing 75 per cent of the vote, defeating former New Democrat Minister of Energy Marg McCuaig-Boyd to sit in the 30th Legislature.

In February 2021, Loewen argued for a regional based reopening strategy during the end of the second wave of the COVID-19 pandemic in Alberta. In April 2021, Loewen was one of 18 United Conservative members to sign an open letter to Premier Jason Kenney criticizing public health measures aimed to reduce the spread of COVID-19. On May 13, 2021 Loewen posted an open letter calling for Premier Jason Kenney to resign, and in the letter Loewen resigned his position as caucus chair, but did not resign from the United Conservative Party. Loewen's letter criticized Kenney's government for weak negotiations with the federal government, ignoring caucus members, delivering contradictory messages, failures in negotiations with doctors over billing, and the controversy regarding coal mining in the Eastern Slopes of the Rocky Mountains.

On May 13, 2021, Loewen and fellow UCP MLA Drew Barnes were kicked out of the UCP caucus by a caucus-wide vote after both criticized the government response to COVID-19.

On June 1, 2022, Loewen registered his candidacy in the 2022 United Conservative Party leadership election, which is scheduled for October 6, 2022.

On October 6, 2022, Loewen received 7.7% of the vote. A total of 6,496 votes were cast for him in the 2022 United Conservative Party leadership election. The following day, he was readmitted into the UCP caucus.

Electoral history

2008 general election

2012 general election

2015 general election

2019 general election

References

Wildrose Party MLAs
Living people
1960s births
Farmers from Alberta
21st-century Canadian politicians
United Conservative Party MLAs
Politicians affected by a party expulsion process